German Sánchez (born 14 February 1972) is a Mexican alpine skier. He competed in two events at the 1992 Winter Olympics.

References

1972 births
Living people
Mexican male alpine skiers
Olympic alpine skiers of Mexico
Alpine skiers at the 1992 Winter Olympics
Place of birth missing (living people)